Unitec may refer to:

UNITEC-1, a satellite
Unitec Institute of Technology, Auckland, New Zealand
Universidad Tecnológica de México, Mexico City, Mexico
Universidad Tecnológica Centroamericana, Tegucigalpa and San Pedro Sula, Honduras
Universidad Tecnológica del Centro, Carabobo, Venezuela
UNITEC (Mexibús), a BRT station in Ecatepec de Morelos

See also 
Unitech (disambiguation)